The 2009 Southern 100 Races were held between Monday 13 July and Thursday 16 July on the 4.25-mile Billown Circuit near Castletown, Isle of Man.

The main event was won by Guy Martin claiming victory in the 2009 Southern 100 Solo Championship race. Sixteen races were held, with Ryan Farquhar taking the most wins with four victories. Roy Richardson and William Dunlop took double victories with, Jamie O'Brien, Dennis Booth, Dave Madsen-Mygdal and Stephen McIlvenna all achieving solo victories. Steven Coombes and Paul Knapton, Ian and Carl Bell, and Glyn Jones and Jason Slous all tasted sidecar success during the meeting.

Race results

Race 12; 2009 Southern 100 Solo Championship Race final standings
Thursday 16 July 2009 10 laps – 4.250 miles Billown Circuit (Reduced Race Distance)

Fastest Lap: Ryan Farquhar, 2' 16.401 112.619 mph on lap 9

Sources

External links

2009 in British motorsport
2009
South